Biatora aureolepra is a species of lichen in the family Ramalinaceae, first found in inland rainforests of British Columbia.

References

Further reading
Holien, H. Å. K. O. N., and T. Tønsberg. "Biatora kodiakensis confirmed from Europe." Graphis Scripta 24 (2012): 49–52.

aureolepra
Lichen species
Lichens described in 2009
Taxa named by Toby Spribille
Lichens of Western Canada